Gledhill is a surname. Notable people with the surname include:

 Adam Gledhill, rugby league player
 Ben Gledhill (born 1989), English rugby league footballer
 Francis Gledhill (1803–1882), New Zealand politician
 Gilbert Gledhill (1889–1946), British Conservative Party politician
 Jonathan Gledhill (1949–2021), Bishop of Lichfield
 Joseph Gledhill (1837–1906), British astronomer
 Keith Gledhill (1911–1999), American tennis player of the 1930s
 Lee Gledhill (born 1980), English footballer
 Mindy Gledhill (born 1981), American singer-songwriter
 Nicholas Gledhill (born 1975), Australian film, stage actor, voice artist, writer and choreographer
 Oliver Gledhill (born 1966), English cellist
 Ruth Gledhill (born 1959), religious correspondent for The Times
 Sammy Gledhill (1913–1994), English footballer
 Samuel Gledhill (1677–1735/6), lieutenant-governor of Placentia, Newfoundland
 Tony Gledhill (born 1938), George Cross recipient

See also
 Gledhill (crater), impact crater on Mars